The Men's 100 metre freestyle competition of the 2020 European Aquatics Championships was held on 18 and 19 May 2021.

Records
Prior to the competition, the existing world, European and championship records were as follows.

The following new records were set during this competition.

Results

Heats
The heats were started on 18 May at 10:00.

Semifinals
The semifinals were held on 18 May at 18:24.

Semifinal 1

Semifinal 2

Final
The final was held on 19 May at 18:19.

References

Men's 100 metre freestyle

External links